Entre a Mi Mundo is the third studio album by American singer Selena, released on May 6, 1992, by EMI Latin. In his recording debut with Selena y Los Dinos, guitarist Chris Pérez had fallen in love with Selena—which Selena's father and manager of the group, Abraham Quintanilla, Jr., disapproved of—and Pérez and Selena eloped on April 2, 1992, after Abraham fired Pérez from the band. Abraham later apologized, accepted Pérez and Selena's relationship, and accepted Pérez as a member of the band. Selena's brother and music producer, A.B. Quintanilla, oversaw production of Entre a Mi Mundo. A.B. also composed most of the tracks on the album along with band members Ricky Vela and Pete Astudillo. The group members' diverse backgrounds aided in the diversity of the genres explored on Entre a Mi Mundo, making it the band's most innovative recording. It includes music genres ranging from synthesized, Tejano and Mexican cumbia to R&B and rock music.

The album's lyrics emphasize female empowerment and self-assertion, while it explores themes such as unrequited love, cheating partners, and teen romance. Entre a Mi Mundo was promoted through live performances in the United States, as well as a high-profile border press tour in Mexico. Selena's performance in Mexico garnered the singer critical acclaim from the Mexican media, who touted the singer as "an artist of the people". She was called the biggest Tejano act in the country after her performance in Nuevo Leon attracted 70,000 attendees. Entre a Mi Mundo received generally positive reviews by music critics, who called it her "breakthrough album". It peaked atop the US Billboard Regional Mexican Albums chart for eight consecutive months. It was named the second best-selling regional Mexican album of all time by Billboard magazine, and it became the first album by a female Tejano singer to sell 300,000 units, becoming the best-selling female Tejano record of all-time; her 1994 album Amor Prohibido broke this record. Entre a Mi Mundo has been certified Diamond (Latin) by the Recording Industry Association of America (RIAA).

Four singles were released from Entre a Mi Mundo; the career-launching single "Como la Flor", "La Carcacha", "¿Qué Creías?", and "Ámame". The former peaked at number six on the US Billboard Hot Latin Songs chart, becoming what was then the highest-peaking single of her career. "Como la Flor" is regarded by music critics to have propelled Selena's career in Mexico. The song has also been called her signature song and her most popular recording. "La Carcacha" gained posthumous popularity, while "¿Qué Creías?" and "Ámame" peaked within the Hot Latin Songs chart top 30. The album won the Tejano Music Award for Album of the Year — Orchestra at the 1993 Tejano Music Awards and tied with La Mafia's Estas Tocando Fuego for Best Regional Mexican Album at the 1993 Lo Nuestro Awards.

Production and development 
The band's lead guitarist, Roger Garcia, had gotten married and parted Selena y Los Dinos after they released their second studio album, Ven Conmigo, in September 1990. Principal record producer and bass guitarist of the group, A.B. Quintanilla, discovered then 21-year-old Chris Pérez, who at the time was the guitarist for Tejano music singer Shelly Lares. Pérez auditioned to be part of the group, finding A.B.'s music production style to be his original inspiration in wanting to become part of Selena y Los Dinos. At first, Abraham Quintanilla, Jr.—the manager of the group, and the father of A.B., Suzette Quintanilla, and Selena—dismissed Pérez, seeing him as more of a rocker and found him to be unequipped for a Tejano band. Betty Cortina, editor-at-large for People magazine, stated that Pérez was the antithesis of Abraham's "clean cut good kids" image. A.B persuaded Abraham that Pérez was capable of performing Tejano music, adding that Pérez's rocker image was harmless. Pérez was then hired as the band's guitarist after the band finished recording Ven Conmigo. Pérez was surprised at how the group worked during the entire production of Entre a Mi Mundo. During pre-production, keyboardist Ricky Vela would sequence the music—Pérez was surprised by how much importance the group put on this—while A.B. would work alongside Vela with any technical problems they faced, as well as choosing the compositions that would be recorded by Selena.

The group would arrive at A.B.'s house during pre-production and perfect their musical components, while Selena picked up the songs that A.B. chose. Pérez found it surprising that Selena could learn songs without any needed assistance. He found this to be consistent during production of Entre a Mi Mundo, where Selena would arrive at the studio and "add so much personality and liveliness to the song", which he believed enabled listeners to relate to the recording. Vela also lauded Selena's capability to quickly "[grasp] the phrasing of the song, the meaning of the song, the gist of what it was trying to convey", finding it to be the equivalent of acting in a film. Pérez reminisced in a 2002 interview that, during production, Vela would come in "[at] the beginning of each day of recording until the very end of the day" to be present if problems arose during production "because he was the man to fix them." He also said that he was anxious going into the studio to perform "Las Cadenas", a song that A.B. and Vela wrote and that surfaced during pre-production. Vela said in a 2002 interview that, during post-production, the band would often want to change a certain verse or lyric at the last minute; Selena would then arrive, adding her own musical taste to those fixes "making something more than what we intended them to be".

Writing and recording 
Recording for Entre a Mi Mundo took place at the San Antonio recording studio belonging to Tejano music producer Manny Guerra. Brian "Red" Moore, Guerra's in-house music engineer, oversaw the production, though A.B. remained the producer, and arranger "calling all the shots". The writing process commenced in early 1991. While choosing the songs to record, Vela gave A.B. several songs that Vela wrote. One of these was an unfinished song called "Si La Quieres". At the time, the song only had "bits and pieces", though A.B. liked its existing chorus. Vela wrote a verse to the song, which did not impress A.B.; Vela then spent several hours on writing verses and melodies before the unrequited love theme was approved. A.B. said in an interview that he wrote "Como la Flor"—a career-launching single that established the band in the Tejano market—in a budget Bryan, Texas, motel the night after a concert. A melody continued to pierce A.B.'s mind that night after he witnessed street vendors with their children "trying to feed their families" by selling plastic stick flowers to patrons at a nearby dance club. A.B. said that this was the original inspiration for "the flower aspect" of the song. It took twenty minutes to add the music to "Como la Flor" with the help of backup vocalist and dancer Pete Astudillo and keyboardist Joe Ojeda, while it took them an hour to complete the lyrics; it was the first song Astudillo co-wrote with A.B.

Vela confessed to using a thesaurus and a dictionary to compete with Astudillo in writing songs for the band when he wrote "Yo Te Sigo Queriendo". Further writing assistance from Astudillo continued with "¿Qué Creias?", which was written in its entirety in the back of a car while the band was touring in California. Tejano singer David Lee Garza lent his "soulful" accordion style on the track. The song "La Carcacha" was written by A.B. after he and Ojeda saw a broken-down car at a restaurant in Ovalo, Texas; Ojeda told A.B. that the Spanish word for it was "carcacha". A month later, A.B. bought a BMW, ordered takeout, and overheard a conversation between two women who said that they would date a man because of his car. A.B. said that this was his inspiration to write a comical song with a moral message; it took him six months to write the song, as he was "fiddling around back and forth" to perfect it. The last song that was recorded for the album, "Amame", was written by Astudillo and Selena; this was the first song that Selena had written since "My Love" (1989).

The only English-language track on the album, "Missing My Baby", was written and recorded to showcase Selena's diverse musical abilities and to add to the album's variety of musical styles. Selena wanted to record an English-language track on the album, as she believed that such a song would convince EMI Records' chairman, Charles Koppelman, that she was ready to release a crossover album. It took A.B. a week to write "Missing My Baby", which was recorded three weeks later in late 1991 at Sun Valley, Los Angeles. Record company EMI Latin wanted R&B duo Full Force to perform a remixed version of the recording. A.B. and Selena met with the group at Full Force's Brooklyn recording studio, and the group agreed to add backing vocals, which they recorded in two days. EMI Latin chose Full Force's version of "Missing My Baby" (instead of Selena's solo version of the song) for the album.

Composition 
At the time of its release, Entre a Mi Mundo included the band's most innovative sound. The band members came from diverse backgrounds which added to the album's influence; Vela created songs with heavy arrangements, Pérez introduced rock and roll, Ojeda incorporated "traditional street music", Astudillo debuted his "complex lyrics and melodies with lots of chords", A.B. continued to perfect his producing abilities, and Selena added soul and versatility into her music. The album contained a diverse musical style, a formula that "was evidently working". According to Joey Guerra of the Houston Chronicle, the band "held a deep respect" for the various genres that they were "updating [on the album]", which was done "effortlessly". Entre a Mi Mundo contained the "full definition" of Selena's trademark sounds—"catchy tunes married to the distinctive, plaintive vocals and a relaxed, danceable cumbia beat". Its content includes musical influences from power-pop, synth-driven Tejano cumbia, traditional Tejano, classic pop, R&B, disco, rock, and funk music. Spin magazine stated that Selena created a template with Entre a Mi Mundo, and called it an "overall Tejano cumbia recording".

Joe Nick Patoski, an author and contributor to The New York Times, said that "La Carcacha" is "an optimum piece of modern music", noting that the recording makes use of call-and-response and includes chants, shouts, whistles, "searing guitar fills", and the singer's "mesmerizing snake-charmer vocals". The lyrical content of the song describes the singer waiting at a street corner for her lover to pull up in his jalopy. Patoski found that the storyline seemed to relate to a life that the singer never had, a "tale of barrio teen romance". Guerra summed up the lyrics as a song "about a boyfriend's beat-up old car". American musicologist Ilan Stavans wrote in Encyclopedia Latina that the song is a "vivid poetic portrait of barrio life." Ramiro Burr said that Selena  Burr, who  said that the band was inspired by cumbia singer Fito Olivares when they recorded "La Carcacha", and called the song a "marvelous" and "danceable cumbia" track. Pérez was asked to perform "Las Cadenas" in a rock style by A.B., who later changed his mind, deciding that the song should be in a conjunto (small band) style instead. Pérez was nonetheless overjoyed to record the song, due of the conjunto nature of the track, which brought back memories of his childhood. Pérez added that Selena's vocals would greatly complement the song, a conjunto song about a jubilant protagonist who regains control of her life after feeling trapped in a relationship. The song made use of the squeezebox, and according to Mario Tarradell of the Dallas Morning News, was "well-crafted, catchy and proficiently played".

The ranchera track "¿Qué Creias?" speaks of a woman who angrily tells her lover off, reminding female listeners "how men take them for granted." The "spirited mariachi kiss-off anthem" lyrically follows an unapologetic woman who refuses to take back a cheating partner. Patoski found "¿Qué Creias?" to be peculiar to Selena's cumbia repertoire, finding it to have the "markings of a traditional mariachi", bordering on "an outright theft." He further added that it showcased her "lack of restraint" emotive vocal range and "spitting out lyrics with the gritty passion of a Lucha Villa", calling it "all sass and fire." The singer said in a July 1993 interview that the song "[speaks] for all the ladies". The lyrics to "Como la Flor" are "simple, plaintive melody and aching". They speak of a woman who witnessed her former lover with another woman and must move on; she wishes them the best, and compares her relationship with her ex-lover to a flower that has withered and died. "Como la Flor" is a "catchy" pop cumbia that depicts a "lovelorn" woman in a "pleading vocal delivery" to a "lost-love". Author Deborah Paredez said that the song signaled Selena's "self-assertion" and found that fans associated the song with "a multivalent emotional register and communal sensibility". Paredez found the recording to contain "emotive chorus to ebullient choreography", and stated that it "captures and conveys" what Roland Barthes called "the grain of Selena's voice". She further added that Selena's "teardrop vocal chords" are present in "Como la Flor", adding that the recording contains a "residue of materiality". Paredez said that, with its melodic shifts, "Como la Flor" successfully "evokes Selena's presence in the elegy marking her absence".

The "street-smart R&B" track "Missing My Baby" was described by Patoski as being "state-of-the-art pop". Lyrically, "Missing My Baby" speaks of mourning an absent lover and reminiscing of rhapsodic events that she once shared with him. Jerry Johnston of the Deseret News said that Selena displayed a "Lesley Gore baby-voice" in "Missing My Baby" and that she "displays a wonderful suppleness in her voice". The Virginian-Pilot said that the song was built on hooks that recall Diana Ross's "Missing You", which is a tribute to Marvin Gaye, and the Beach Boys' "Good to My Baby". Mario Tarradell of The Dallas Morning News said that "Missing My Baby" and other tracks were added to Entre a Mi Mundo "for good measure". Guerra found the music in "Amame" to contain "fiery club rhythms", while its lyrics call on the singer's crush, asking him to love her. In the polka "Vuelve a Mi", the singer recalls the day that her lover abandoned her on a rainy day, and pleads that he returns to her.

Release and artwork 
Months before Entre a Mi Mundo was scheduled to be released, Pérez was booked on charges for driving under the influence, assaulting police officers, resisting arrest, and initiating a high-speed chase with police. In December 1992, Pérez was convicted and was ordered to pay $670 (1992 USD) in fines, court costs, and attorney fees. Pérez wrote that he felt guilty for the crimes that he was charged with, noting that Selena tried to convince Abraham that Pérez was a well-rounded person. Pérez later told Abraham about his wrongdoing, but was dumbfounded when Abraham forgave him, a reaction that Pérez was not expecting. After the band completed the recording sessions for Entre a Mi Mundo, several members of the band and their friends went to a hotel in San Antonio, Texas, to celebrate. According to Pérez, he, along with several of his friends, trashed the hotel. The next morning, Abraham was contacted by the manager of the hotel where the incident took place; Abraham immediately fired two road crew members. Pérez believed that Abraham would come for him next and fire him, but found that after he had apologized, Abraham accepted his apology and allowed him to continue being the band's guitarist.

During the pre-production stages of Entre a Mi Mundo, Selena and Pérez had fallen in love—despite their fellow band members warning them about Abraham. Selena and Pérez decided to date discretely to avoid a negative reaction from Abraham. After finding out about their relationship from Suzette, Abraham fired Pérez from the group just weeks before the album was due to be released, and threatened to disband the group if Selena went after Pérez. Selena and Pérez decided to elope in Corpus Christi, Texas, on April 2, 1992; a move that Selena chose believing that her father would have never approved of them. In the days following their marriage, Abraham approached Pérez after news of their elopement spread on local news and radio stations, apologized, accepted their relationship, and accepted Pérez back into the band as its guitarist.

In February 1992, Al Rendon was hired by EMI Latin to take photographs for Entre a Mi Mundo. A previous photographer had taken some photos of the singer, which were not well received by the company, and Rendon was asked to do a "quick session". Rendon rented a studio and hired John MacBurney—whom Abraham constantly argued with—to do the makeup. MacBurney "privately complained" to EMI Latin that Abraham was difficult to deal with. Rendon and MacBurney, however, found Selena "real easy to work with". Selena picked out the outfit for herself to wear in the cover picture; this outfit included a black top with a mesh see-through midriff, a long-sleeve black jacket with black-and-white striped long sleeves, a wide black leather belt, and tight black pants. She chose a pose where she runs her fingers through her hair, a pose that Abraham was noticeably bothered with. In 1998, the outfit that she wore for the album cover was added to a museum that her family operates in Corpus Christi, Texas.

Entre a Mi Mundo was released in the United States on May 6, 1992. During the twentieth anniversary of Selena's first music release, Entre a Mi Mundo was repackaged and made available for physical and digital purchase on September 22, 2002. The limited edition version included Selena's duet with Salvadoran singer Álvaro Torres on their 1991 single "Buenos Amigos"; a cover, recorded in 1989, of Air Supply's Russell Hitchcock's solo career single "Where Did the Feeling Go?"; music videos for "La Carcacha" and "Buenos Amigos"; and spoken liner notes containing commentary and recollections of each track provided by the singer's family, friends, and band.

Singles 
"Como la Flor" was released as the album's leadoff single in late June 1992. It debuted at number 36 on the US Billboard Hot Latin Songs chart on the week ending on July 18, 1992. The track peaked at number six on the Hot Latin Songs chart on the week ending October 24; at the time, this was Selena's highest peak as a solo artist. It finished the year at number 31 on the Hot Latin Songs year-end list. "La Carcacha" was released as the album's second single. Though it failed to attain any chart success, it gained fan popularity posthumously. "¿Qué Creias?" followed in November 1992, debuting at number 38 on Billboards Hot Latin Songs chart on November 28, and peaking at number 14 on February 6, 1993. The album's final single, "Amame", released in April 1993, peaked at number 27 on May 22, 1993. Following the murder of Selena on March 31, 1995, "Como la Flor" debuted and peaked at number nine on the US Billboard Regional Mexican Airplay chart on April 15.

Critics have collectively credited "Como la Flor" as having helped launch the singer's career in Mexico; it has since been regarded as Selena's signature song and her most popular recording. The single has enjoyed international success, and Selena's dominance on the Latin music charts in the '90s is credited to it. Following Selena's death, Cathy Ragland of the Austin American Statesman compared the "Como la Flor" to the singer as being "a metaphor for her life- a beautiful, delicate creature".

Promotion 
Selena performed at the Los Angeles Fiesta Broadway, the largest Cinco de Mayo celebration in the United States. The singer performed "Enamorada de Ti" from her Ven Conmigo album and introduced the crowd to "Si La Quieres" from Entre a Mi Mundo. According to biographer Himilce Novas, Selena's performance "captivated" those in attendance. In April 1992, Selena attended a music promotional trip for Billboard in Las Vegas at Caesar's Palace. She was also booked for a high-profile border press tour in Monterrey, Mexico with music media types in a meet-and-greet conference. At the time, Tejanos were looked down on as "hayseed pochos" among Mexican citizens. Also, the singer's Spanish was far from fluent; EMI Latin executives were "terrified" about the singer's limited Spanish during the press conference for the album in Mexico. According to Patoski, Selena "played her cards right" during the conference and won over the Mexican media after newspapers hailed her as "an artist of the people". The newspapers found her to be a refreshing change from Mexican telenovela actors "who were fair-skinned, blond-haired, and green-eyed." After her publicity press, Selena was booked to play at several concerts throughout Mexico, including a performance at Festival Acapulco in May 1993, which garnered her critical acclaim. Her performance in Nuevo Leon on September 17, 1993, was attended by 70,000 people, garnering her the title of the biggest Tejano act in Mexico.

During her live renditions to "Como la Flor", Selena performed her signature move: a flamenco-inspired floreo hand gesture "turning her wrist in three  waves, elbow to fingertips twisting in serpentine motion, fingers elongated" as she "languorously croons" the title of the song. Selena often performed the chorus to "Como la Flor" first in a downtempo "mournful attenuated cadenza", then in an upbeat cumbia. During the singer's performances for "¿Qué Creias?", she would often ask a male attendee to play her "ex-boyfriend" as she sang to him.

Critical reception

Reviews 

The vast majority of contemporary reviews were positive, and the album received widespread critical acclaim. Music critics found the recording to be Selena's "breakthrough album". Bruce Tomaso of The Dallas Morning News said that "[the singer's] brand of Tejano pop" helped elevate Selena to a "sizable audience" which was attracted to the singer's vocals. This was echoed by fellow contributor Mario Tarradell, who said that the album signaled Selena's entry into the pop market of Latin music, and said that it was a "star-making turn" for Selena as a soloist. Ramiro Burr of the San Antonio Express-News wrote that Entre a Mi Mundo fortified the "Selena juggernaut".

Joey Guerra, doing a promotional editorial piece for Amazon.com, found the album to be "consistently satisfying and wonderfully diverse", and applauded A.B., who helped challenge the singer in the "often-stifling boundaries of Tejano music." Guerra wrote in an earlier editorial piece for Houston Chronicle in March 2005 that he was introduced to "Selena's brand" of Tejano music and was immediately hooked. Guerra called the album a "diverse collection" and credited the singer's "transformation into a Latin music icon" to the album. Domino Renee Perez, also from Houston Chronicle, said that Entre a Mi Mundo "[served] as a gateway" for Selena's subsequent releases. David Browne, an editor for Entertainment Weekly, called the album a "tentative potpourri of both modern and traditional styles". The album brought pop fans to Tejano music, and is listed as a recommended listen list on The History of Texas Music.

Accolades 
At the 1993 Lo Nuestro Awards, Selena tied with Tejano band La Mafia's Estas Tocando Fuego for Best Regional Mexican Album for Entre a Mi Mundo. At the awards ceremony, "Como la Flor" won Regional Mexican Song of the Year. At the 1993 Tejano Music Awards, Selena won the Tejano Music Award for Female Vocalist of the Year and the Tejano Music Award for Female Entertainer of the Year, which she had done the previous year as well. Entre a Mi Mundo won Album of the Year — Orchestra, while "Como la Flor" was nominated for Single of the Year.

Commercial performance 
Entre a Mi Mundo sold 50,000 units in pre-sale copies, and debuted at number nine on the then-biweekly US Billboard Regional Mexican Albums chart for the week ending June 13, 1992. It peaked at number one on September 5, 1992, displacing La Mafia's Estas Tocando Fuego from the top spot. The album remained at number one for 18 consecutive weeks until La Mafia dethroned Entre a Mi Mundo in the week ending May 15, 1993.  By July 1993, Entre a Mi Mundo had sold 100,000 units in the United States. On July 10, 1993, Entre a Mi Mundo debuted at number 10 on the newly formed US Billboard Top Latin Albums chart. Entre a Mi Mundo finished 1992 as the sixth best-selling US Regional Mexican Album, and in 1993, it was the best-selling regional Mexican record. In December 1993, the album had sold 300,000 units, breaking the record for largest sales by a female Tejano artist. As a result, Entre a Mi Mundo became the best-selling Tejano album by a female artist, until Amor Prohibido (also by Selena) broke the record in 1994. In 1994, Entre a Mi Mundo ranked as the second best-selling regional Mexican album of all-time.

Media attention revolving around Selena's death helped increase sales of Entre a Mi Mundo, as well as her back catalogue. The album re-entered the Top Latin Albums chart, peaking at number four. Entre a Mi Mundo debuted at number 179 on the US Billboard 200, and peaked at number 97 on May 6, 1995. At the end of 1995, it was the seventh best-selling US Latin album and the fourth best-selling US Regional Mexican Album. In June 1995, the album was certified gold by the Recording Industry Association of America (RIAA), due to having shipped 500,000 units. By 1994, the album had sold 200,000 units in Mexico. As of 1997, it had sold 385,000 units in Mexico,  As of November 2017, the album had been certified Diamond (Latin), denoting shipments of 600,000 album-equivalent units in the United States.

Track listing 
Credits adapted from the liner notes of Entre a Mi Mundo.

Credits and personnel 
Credits adapted from the liner notes of Entre a Mi Mundo.

Vocal credits
Selena – vocals, background vocals, composing
Pete Astudillo, A.B. Quintanilla – background vocals

Visuals and imagery
Suzette Quintanilla – stylist 
Al Rendon – photography 
Lisette Lorenzo – art direction
Lisy – artwork and design 
Ramon Hernandez – re-issue photography

Instruments

Suzette Quintanilla – drums
Chris Pérez – electric guitar
A.B. Quintanilla – bass guitar
Joe Ojeda – keyboards
Ricky Vela – keyboards

David Lee Garza – accordion
Manny Guerra – accordion
Joel Guzman – trumpet
Rodney B. – guitar 

Technical and production credits

A.B. Quintanilla – composing, producing, programming, mixing, arranging
Ricky Vela – composing, programming, arranging
Jorge A. Pino – executive producing
Brian "Red" Moore – engineering, mixing
Nir Seroussi – editing
Guillermo J. Page – reissue producing
Manny Guerra – engineering

Charts

Weekly charts

All-time charts

Year-end charts

Certifications and sales

See also 

 1992 in Latin music
 Selena albums discography
 Latin American music in the United States
 Billboard Regional Mexican Albums Year-end Chart, 1990s

Notes

References

Bibliography

External links 

1992 albums
Albums produced by A.B. Quintanilla
EMI Latin albums
Spanish-language albums
Selena albums
Tejano Music Award winners for Album of the Year